Duke of Marlborough (pronounced ) is a title in the Peerage of England. It was created by Queen Anne in 1702 for John Churchill, 1st Earl of Marlborough (1650–1722), the noted military leader. In historical texts, unqualified use of the title typically refers to the 1st Duke. The name of the dukedom refers to Marlborough in Wiltshire.

The earldom of Marlborough was held by the family of Ley from its creation 1626 until its extinction with the death of the 4th earl in 1679. The title was recreated 10 years later for John Churchill (in 1689).

History of the dukedom
Churchill had been made Lord Churchill of Eyemouth (1682) in the Peerage of Scotland, and Baron Churchill of Sandridge (1685) and Earl of Marlborough (1689) in the Peerage of England. Shortly after her accession to the throne in 1702, Queen Anne made Churchill the first Duke of Marlborough and granted him the subsidiary title Marquess of Blandford.

In 1678, Churchill married Sarah Jennings (1660–1744), a courtier and influential favourite of the queen. They had seven children, of whom four daughters married into some of the most important families in Great Britain; one daughter and one son died in infancy. He was pre-deceased by his son, John Churchill, Marquess of Blandford, in 1703; so, to prevent the extinction of the titles, a special Act of Parliament was passed. When the 1st Duke of Marlborough died in 1722 his title as Lord Churchill of Eyemouth in the Peerage of Scotland became extinct and the Marlborough titles passed, according to the Act, to his eldest daughter Henrietta (1681–1733), the 2nd Duchess of Marlborough. She was married to the 2nd Earl of Godolphin and had a son who predeceased her.

When Henrietta died in 1733, the Marlborough titles passed to her nephew Charles Spencer (1706–1758), the third son of her late sister Anne (1683–1716), who had married the 3rd Earl of Sunderland in 1699. After his older brother's death in 1729, Charles Spencer had already inherited the Spencer family estates and the titles of Earl of Sunderland (1643) and Baron Spencer of Wormleighton (1603), all in the Peerage of England. Upon his maternal aunt Henrietta's death in 1733, Charles Spencer succeeded to the Marlborough family estates and titles and became the 3rd Duke. When he died in 1758, his titles passed to his eldest son George (1739–1817), who was succeeded by his eldest son George, the 5th Duke (1766–1840). In 1815, Francis Spencer (the younger son of the 4th Duke) was created Baron Churchill in the Peerage of the United Kingdom. In 1902, his grandson, the 3rd Baron Churchill, was created Viscount Churchill.

In 1817, the 5th Duke obtained permission to assume and bear the surname of Churchill in addition to his surname of Spencer, to perpetuate the name of his illustrious great-great-grandfather. At the same time he received Royal Licence to quarter the coat of arms of Churchill with his paternal arms of Spencer. The modern Dukes thus originally bore the surname "Spencer": the double-barrelled surname of "Spencer-Churchill" as used since 1817 remains in the family, although many members have preferred to style themselves simply as "Churchill".

The 7th Duke was the paternal grandfather of the British Prime Minister Sir Winston Churchill, born at Blenheim Palace on 30 November 1874.

The 11th Duke, John Spencer-Churchill died in 2014, having assumed the title in 1972. The 12th and present Duke is Charles James Spencer-Churchill.

Family seat

The family seat is Blenheim Palace in Woodstock, Oxfordshire.

After his leadership in the victory against the French in the Battle of Blenheim on 13 August 1704, the 1st Duke was honoured by Queen Anne granting him the royal manor of Woodstock, and building him a house at her expense to be called Blenheim. Construction started in 1705 and the house was completed in 1722, the year of the 1st Duke's death. Blenheim Palace has since remained in the Churchill and Spencer-Churchill family.

With the exception of the 10th Duke and his first wife, the Dukes and Duchesses of Marlborough are buried in Blenheim Palace's chapel. Most other members of the Spencer-Churchill family are interred in St. Martin's parish churchyard at Bladon, a short distance from the palace.

Succession to the title
The dukedom can theoretically pass through a female line. However, unlike the remainder to heirs general found in most other peerages that allow male-preference primogeniture, the grant does not allow for abeyance and follows a more restrictive Semi-Salic formula designed to keep succession wherever possible in the male line. The succession is as follows:

Succession to the title under the first and second contingencies has lapsed; holders of the title from the 3rd Duke trace their status from the third contingency.

It is now very unlikely that the dukedom will be passed to a woman or through a woman, since all the male-line descendants of the 1st Duke's second daughter Anne Spencer, Countess of Sunderland—including the lines of the Viscounts Churchill and Barons Churchill of Wychwood and of the Earl Spencer and of the entire Spencer-Churchill and Spencer family—would have to become extinct.

If that were to happen, the Churchill titles would pass to the Earl of Jersey, the heir-male of the 1st Duke's granddaughter Anne Villiers (born Egerton), Countess of Jersey, daughter of Elizabeth Egerton, Duchess of Bridgewater, the third daughter of the first Duke.

The next heir would be the Duke of Buccleuch, the heir-male of the 1st Duke's great-granddaughter Elizabeth Montagu, Duchess of Buccleuch, the daughter of Mary Montagu, Duchess of Montagu (1766 creation), the daughter of the 1st Duke's youngest daughter Mary, Duchess of Montagu (1705 creation).

The fourth surviving line is represented by the Earl of Chichester and his family, the heir-male of the 1st Duke's most senior great-great-granddaughter Mary Henrietta Osborne, Countess of Chichester, daughter of Francis Osborne, 5th Duke of Leeds, only child of Mary Godolphin, Duchess of Leeds, daughter of the 1st Duke's eldest daughter Henrietta Godolphin, 2nd Duchess of Marlborough, by her husband Francis Godolphin, 2nd Earl of Godolphin.

Line of succession

 John Churchill, 1st Duke of Marlborough (1650–1722)
 Henrietta Godolphin, 2nd Duchess of Marlborough (1681–1733)
Anne Spencer, Countess of Sunderland (1683–1716)
 Charles Spencer, 3rd Duke of Marlborough (1706–1758)
 George Spencer, 4th Duke of Marlborough (1739–1817)
 George Spencer-Churchill, 5th Duke of Marlborough (1766–1840)
 George Spencer-Churchill, 6th Duke of Marlborough (1793–1857)
 John Spencer-Churchill, 7th Duke of Marlborough (1822–1883)
 George Spencer-Churchill, 8th Duke of Marlborough (1844–1892)
 Charles Spencer-Churchill, 9th Duke of Marlborough (1871–1934)
 John Spencer-Churchill, 10th Duke of Marlborough (1897–1972)
 John Spencer-Churchill, 11th Duke of Marlborough (1926–2014)
 James Spencer-Churchill, 12th Duke of Marlborough (born 1955) 
 (1) George Spencer-Churchill, Marquess of Blandford (b. 1992)
 (2) Lord Caspar Spencer-Churchill (b. 2008) 
 (3) Lord Edward Spencer-Churchill (b. 1974) 
 Lord Charles Spencer-Churchill (1940–2016)
 (4) Rupert Spencer-Churchill (b. 1971) 
 (5) Dominic Spencer-Churchill (b. 1979) 
 (6) Ivor Spencer-Churchill (b. 2014)
 (7) Alexander Spencer-Churchill (b. 1983) 
Lord Ivor Spencer-Churchill (1898–1956)
 (8) Robert Spencer-Churchill (b. 1954)
 (9) John Spencer-Churchill (b. 1984)
 (10) Ivor Spencer-Churchill (b. 1986)
Lord Randolph Spencer-Churchill (1849–1895)Sir Winston Churchill (1874–1965)Randolph Spencer-Churchill (1911–1968)Winston Spencer-Churchill (1940–2010) (11) Randolph Spencer-Churchill (b. 1965)
 (12) John Spencer-Churchill (b. 2007)
 (13) John Spencer-Churchill (b. 1975)
 (14) Edward Spencer-Churchill (b. 2008)
 (15) Alexander Spencer-Churchill (b. 2014)
 Francis Spencer, 1st Baron Churchill (1779–1845)Augustus Spencer (1807–1893)Augustus Spencer (1851–1912)Richard Spencer (1888–1956) Richard Spencer, 6th Baron Churchill (1926–2020)(16)  Michael Spencer, 7th Baron Churchill (b. 1960)
(17) David Spencer (b. 1970)William Spencer (1810–1900)William Spencer (1838–1923)John Spencer (1881–1952)John Spencer (1917–1967)(18) John Spencer (b. 1957)
(19) Charles Spencer (b. 1990)Charles Spencer (1824–1895)Charles Spencer (1848–1922)
Francis Spencer (1881–1972)
Francis Spencer (1917–1989)
(20) Philip Spencer (b. 1966)
Lord Charles Spencer (1740–1820)
John Spencer (1767–1831)
Frederick Spencer (1796–1831)
Charles Spencer (1827–1898)
Sir Charles Spencer (1869–1934)
John Spencer (1907–1977)
(21) Robert Spencer (b. 1944)(22) Edmund Spencer (b. 1991)
Charles Spencer (1909–1963)
(23) Piers Spencer (b. 1963)John Spencer (1708–1746) John Spencer, 1st Earl Spencer (1734–1783) George Spencer, 2nd Earl Spencer (1758–1834) Frederick Spencer, 4th Earl Spencer (1798–1857) Charles Spencer, 6th Earl Spencer (1857–1922) Albert Spencer, 7th Earl Spencer (1892–1975) John Spencer, 8th Earl Spencer (1924–1992)(24)  Charles Spencer, 9th Earl Spencer (b. 1964)
(25) Louis Spencer, Viscount Althorp (b. 1994) 
(26) Edmund Spencer  (b. 2003)George Spencer (1903–1982)(27) George Spencer (b. 1932)Lady Elizabeth Churchill (1687–1714)Lady Anne Egerton (1705–1762) George Villiers, 4th Earl of Jersey (1735–1805) George Child Villiers, 5th Earl of Jersey (1773–1859) George Child Villiers, 6th Earl of Jersey (1808–1859) Victor Child Villiers, 7th Earl of Jersey (1845–1915) George Child Villiers, 8th Earl of Jersey (1873–1923) George Child Villiers, 9th Earl of Jersey (1910–1998)George Child-Villiers, Viscount Villiers (1948–1998) (28) William Child-Villiers, 10th Earl of Jersey (b. 1976)
 (29) George Child-Villiers, Viscount Villiers (b. 2015)
 (30) Jamie Child-Villiers (b. 1994)Edward Child-Villiers (1913–1980) (31) Edward Child-Villiers (b. 1935)
 (32) Alexander Child-Villiers (b. 1961)
 (33) Frederick Child-Villiers (b. 1990)
 (34) William Child-Villiers (b. 2003)
 (35) George Child-Villiers (b. 1947)

Other titles of the Dukes

Subsidiary titles
The Duke holds subsidiary titles: Marquess of Blandford (created in 1702 for John Churchill), Earl of Sunderland (created in 1643 for the Spencer family), Earl of Marlborough (created in 1689 for John Churchill), Baron Spencer of Wormleighton (created in 1603 for the Spencer family), and Baron Churchill of Sandridge (created in 1685 for John Churchill), all in the Peerage of England.

The title Marquess of Blandford is used as the courtesy title for the Duke's eldest son and heir. The Duke's eldest son's eldest son can use the courtesy title Earl of Sunderland, and the duke's eldest son's eldest son's eldest son (not necessarily the eldest great-grandson) the title Lord Spencer of Wormleighton (not to be confused with Earl Spencer).

The title of Earl of Marlborough, created for John Churchill in 1689, had previously been created for James Ley, in 1626, becoming extinct in 1679.

Foreign titles
The 1st Duke was honoured with land and titles in the Holy Roman Empire: Emperor Leopold I created him a Prince in 1704, and in 1705, his successor Emperor Joseph I gave him the principality of Mindelheim (once the lordship of the noted soldier Georg von Frundsberg). He was obliged to surrender Mindelheim in 1714 by the Treaty of Utrecht, which returned it to Bavaria. He tried to obtain Nellenburg in Austria in exchange, which at that time was only a county ('Landgrafschaft'), but this failed, partially because Austrian law did not allow for Nellenburg to be converted into a sovereign principality. The 1st Duke's princely title of Mindelheim became extinct either on the return of the land to Bavaria or on his death, as the Empire operated Salic Law, which prevented female succession.

Coats of arms

Original arms of the Churchill family

The original arms of Sir Winston Churchill (1620–1688), father of the 1st Duke of Marlborough, were simple and in use by his own father in 1619. The shield was Sable a lion rampant Argent, debruised by a bendlet Gules. The addition of a canton of Saint George (see below) rendered the distinguishing mark of the bendlet unnecessary.

The Churchill crest is blazoned as a lion couchant guardant Argent, supporting with its dexter forepaw a banner Gules, charged with a dexter hand appaumée of the first, staff Or.

In recognition of Sir Winston's services to King Charles I as Captain of the Horse, and his loyalty to King Charles II as a Member of Parliament, he was awarded an augmentation of honour to his arms around 1662. This rare mark of royal favour took the form of a canton of Saint George. At the same time, he was authorised to omit the bendlet, which had served the purpose of distinguishing this branch of the Churchill family from others which bore an undifferenced lion.

Arms of the 1st Duke of Marlborough

Sir Winston's shield and crest were inherited by his son John Churchill, 1st Duke of Marlborough. Minor modifications reflected the bearer's social rise: the helm was now shown in profile and had a closed grille to signify the bearer's rank as a peer, and there were now supporters placed on either side of the shield. They were the mythical Griffin (part lion, part eagle) and Wyvern (a dragon without hind legs). The supporters were derived from the arms of the family of the 1st Duke's mother, Drake of Ash (Argent, a wyvern gules; these arms can be seen on the monument in Musbury Church to Sir Bernard Drake, d.1586).

The motto was Fiel pero desdichado (Spanish for "Faithful but unfortunate"). The 1st Duke was also entitled to a coronet indicating his rank.

When the 1st Duke was made a Prince of the Holy Roman Empire in 1705, two unusual features were added: the Imperial Eagle and a Princely Coronet. His estates in Germany, such as Mindelheim, were represented in his arms by additional quarterings.

Arms of the Spencer-Churchill family

In 1817, the 5th Duke received Royal Licence to place the quarter of Churchill ahead of his paternal arms of Spencer. The shield of the Spencer family arms is: quarterly Argent and Gules, in the second and third quarters a fret Or, over all on a bend Sable three escallops of the first. The Spencer crest is: out of a ducal coronet Or, a griffin's head between two wings expanded Argent, gorged with a collar gemel and armed Gules. Paul Courtenay observes that "It would be normal in these circumstances for the paternal arms (Spencer) to take precedence over the maternal (Churchill), but because the Marlborough dukedom was senior to the Sunderland earldom, the procedure was reversed in this case."

Also in 1817, a further augmentation of honour was added to his armorial achievement. This incorporated the bearings from the standard of the Manor of Woodstock and was borne on an escutcheon, displayed over all in the centre chief point, as follows: Argent a cross of Saint George surmounted by an inescutcheon Azure, charged with three fleurs-de-lys Or, two over one. This inescutcheon represents the royal arms of France.

These quartered arms, incorporating the two augmentations of honour, have been the arms of all subsequent Dukes of Marlborough.

Motto
The motto Fiel pero desdichado is Spanish for 'Faithful but unfortunate'. Desdichado means without happiness or without joy, alluding to the first Duke's father, Winston, who was a royalist and faithful supporter of the king during the English Civil War but was not compensated for his losses after the restoration. Charles II knighted Winston Churchill and other Civil War royalists but did not compensate them for their wartime losses, thereby inducing Winston to adopt the motto. It is unusual for the motto of an Englishman of the era to be in Spanish rather than Latin, and it is not known why this is the case.

Gallery of arms

Achievement

List of title holders

 Earls of Marlborough, first creation (1626–1679) 

The earldom of Marlborough was held by the family of Ley from 1626 to 1679. James Ley, the 1st Earl (c. 1550 – 1629), was lord chief justice of the King’s Bench in Ireland and then in England; he was an English member of parliament and was lord high treasurer from 1624 to 1628. In 1624 he was created Baron Ley and in 1626 Earl of Marlborough. The 3rd earl was his grandson James (1618–1665), a naval officer who was killed in action with the Dutch. James was succeeded by his uncle William, a younger son of the 1st earl, on whose death in 1679 the earldom became extinct.

Earls of Marlborough, second creation (1689)Other titles: Lord Churchill of Eyemouth, in the county of Berwick (Scotland 1682) and Baron Churchill of Sandridge, in the county of Hertford (England 1685) John Churchill, 1st Earl of Marlborough (1650–1722), became Duke of Marlborough in 1702

Dukes of Marlborough (1702)Other titles: Marquess of Blandford (England 1702), Earl of Marlborough, in the county of Wiltshire (En 1689) and Baron Churchill of Sandridge, in the county of Hertford (England 1685)Other titles (1st Duke): Lord Churchill of Eyemouth, in the county of Berwick (Scotland 1682) John Churchill, 1st Duke of Marlborough (1650–1722), soldier and statesman
 John Churchill, Marquess of Blandford (1686–1703), elder son of the 1st Duke, died unmarried
 Henrietta Godolphin, 2nd Duchess of Marlborough (1681–1733), eldest daughter of the 1st Duke, succeeded her father by Act of Parliament (1706)
 William Godolphin, Marquess of Blandford (1700–1731), elder son of the 2nd Duchess, predeceased his mother without issue
 Anne Spencer, Countess of Sunderland (née Lady Anne Churchill; 1683–1716), second daughter of the 1st Duke, married Charles Spencer, 3rd Earl of Sunderland, predeceased her elder sister, leaving male issueOther titles (3rd Duke onwards): Earl of Sunderland (England 1643) and Baron Spencer of Wormleighton (England 1729)''

 Charles Spencer, 3rd Duke of Marlborough (1706–1758), 5th Earl of Sunderland, second son of Anne Spencer, Countess of Sunderland
 George Spencer, 4th Duke of Marlborough (1739–1817), elder son of the 3rd Duke
 George Spencer-Churchill, 5th Duke of Marlborough (1766–1840), elder son of the 4th Duke
 George Spencer-Churchill, 6th Duke of Marlborough (1793–1857), eldest son of the 5th Duke
 John Winston Spencer-Churchill, 7th Duke of Marlborough (1822–1883), eldest son of the 6th Duke and paternal grandfather of Winston Churchill
 George Charles Spencer-Churchill, 8th Duke of Marlborough (1844–1892), eldest son of the 7th Duke
 Charles Richard John Spencer-Churchill, 9th Duke of Marlborough (1871–1934), only son of the 8th Duke
 John Albert William Spencer-Churchill, 10th Duke of Marlborough (1897–1972), elder son of the 9th Duke
 John George Vanderbilt Henry Spencer-Churchill, 11th Duke of Marlborough (1926–2014), elder son of the 10th Duke
 Charles James Spencer-Churchill, 12th Duke of Marlborough (b. 1955), eldest surviving son of the 11th Duke

The heir apparent to the dukedom is George John Godolphin Spencer-Churchill, Marquess of Blandford (b. 1992), eldest son of the 12th Duke.

Family tree

References

External links 

 Blenheim Palace website
 Cracroft's Peerage page
 European Heraldry website – Churchill
 European Heraldry website – Spencer

Dukedoms in the Peerage of England
Duke
 
Peerages created with special remainders
Noble titles created in 1702